Allan Hills may refer to any of the following:

Landforms
Allan Hills, are hills in Antarctica
Allan Hills (Saskatchewan), are hills in Saskatchewan

Communities
Allan Hills, Saskatchewan, a community in Saskatchewan

Meteorites
Allan Hills 84001, is a fragment of a Martian meteorite
Allan Hills 77005, is a fragment of a Martian meteorite
Allan Hills A81005, the first lunar meteorite found on Earth

See also
Allan Hill
Allan C. Hill
Allen Hill (disambiguation)